The Taigan, and also known as Kyrgyz Taighany (Kyrgyzskaya Borzaya in Russian), Mongolian Taiga dog is a breed of sighthound from Kyrgyzstan. The Taigan is found in the alpine Tian Shan region of Kyrgyzstan on the border with China, it is closely related to the Tazy and the Saluki.

As a sighthound, the Taigan predominantly uses its sight and speed to overcome its prey. The breed is known for its extraordinary stamina at altitude, and its versatility whilst hunting. They are capable of following scent trails and also have a reputation for retrieving game. Taigans are often used to hunt in combination with trained bird of prey, especially the golden eagle. The Taigan is used to hunt a wide range game including marmot, hare, fox, badger, wildcat, hoofed game such as the ibex and roe deer as well as the wolf.

The Taigan has medium-length and slightly curly hair, it has a wide range of colours ranging from white and shades of fawn through to greys and black examples. Since the breakup of the Soviet Union the Taigan's numbers have significantly declined, but the Russian Kennel Club has made concerted efforts to ensure the breed's survival, recognising it along with the Tasy, and trying to find good breeding stock of both breeds.

See also
 Dogs portal
 List of dog breeds

References

External links 

 Association "Kirghizcynology" (Russian)
 www.taigany.republika.pl (Poland)

Sighthounds
Dog breeds originating in Kyrgyzstan